Mirror Lakes is a Norwegian band established by guitar player Knut Schreiner (from Euroboys, Turbonegro) and Frode Fivel (solo singer, also member of Hello Goodbye) as lead acts of the band, after they met at a concert in Oslo. Soon Trond Mjøen, a previous colleague of Schreiner also from Euroboys joined in. Later bass player Havard Krogedal (from I Was a King and Loch Ness Mouse) joined, so did drummer Arne Mathisen (from Heroes & Zeros and PowPow).

Making gigs since 2010 and signed to Warner Music, they released their eponymous debut album Mirror Lakes, a double album with 17 tracks recorded in Gothenburg, Oslo and New York.

Members
Frode Fivel - vocals
Knut Schreiner - guitar
Trond Mjøen - guitar
Håvard Krogedal - bass
Arne Mathisen - drums

Discography

Albums

References

External links
Warner Music website Mirror Lakes page
Mirror Lakes page on LastFM

Norwegian musical groups